The powdered dancer (Argia moesta) is a damselfly of the family Coenagrionidae. It is native to North America. It may be seen year-round in at least some of its range.

Etymology 
The common name refers directly to the male's pruinosity, appearing to be covered with a powdery blue or grayish substance. Older males are more pruinose, and may even be more ash white than blue. The scientific name moesta, means sorrowful, and may refer to customs (such as those on Ash Wednesday) of dusting oneself with ashes to express sorrow or mourning.

Description

Males have a blue tip at the end of the abdomen. Immature (freshly moulted, or teneral) males are tan to dark brown, turning darker with age and becoming almost completely whitish (pruinose) at maturity.

Females come in blue and brown forms based on the color of the thorax, which has hair thin dark shoulder stripes.

The blue form female is very similar to the female blue-fronted dancer; a key to separating these two is the number of cells below the stigma: our species has two cells below the stigma where a blue-fronted dancer has one.

Breeding
During mating, a male uses claspers at the end of his abdomen to grab a female between the head and thorax, forming a tandem. The female then bends her abdomen to engage segments 2–3 of the male, where sperm is stored, forming a heart-shaped "mating wheel". Both sexes can change color during mating.

The pair often remains attached until eggs are laid by the female. The female finds a shallow aquatic plant and uses her ovipositor to insert her eggs in dead or live tissue while guarded by her mate.

References

External links
 Argia moesta on BugGuide.Net

Coenagrionidae
Odonata of North America
Insects of the United States
Insects of Canada
Insects of Mexico
Fauna of the Eastern United States
Fauna of the Western United States
Fauna of California
Insects described in 1861